Stadionul Otto Greffner is a multi-use stadium in Șiria, Romania. It is used mostly for football matches and is the home ground of Șiriana Șiria. In the past, for a short period, was also the home ground of UTA Arad and defunct Şoimii Pâncota. The stadium holds 2,000 people. For the Liga I play-off between UTA Arad and ACS Poli Timișoara mobile stands are used to increase the stadium capacity.

References

Football venues in Romania
Buildings and structures in Arad County